YU 100: najbolji albumi jugoslovenske rok i pop muzike (trans. YU 100: the Greatest Yugoslav Rock and Pop Music Albums) is a book by Duško Antonić and Danilo Štrbac, published in 1998. It features a list of top 100 former Yugoslav popular music albums, formed according to the poll of 70 Serbian music critics, journalists, artists and others.

Statistics

Artists with the most albums
8 Bijelo Dugme
8 Riblja Čorba
5 Azra
4 Bajaga i Instruktori
4 Film
4 Haustor
4 Leb i Sol
4 Idoli (including the split album Paket aranžman)
3 Đorđe Balašević (including the album Mojoj mami umesto maturske slike u izlogu by his band Rani Mraz)
3 Disciplina Kičme

Record labels by the number of albums
47 Jugoton
28 PGP-RTB
12 ZKP RTLJ
7 Helidon
2 Diskoton
2 Suzy
2 Alta
1 Carlo Records

Producers with the most albums
4 Goran Bregović, Saša Habić, Kornelije Kovač, Enco Lesić, Ivo Umek, Ivan "Piko" Stančić, Branimir "Džoni" Štulić
3 Boris Bele, Nikola Borota, Neil Harrison, John McCoy, Dave Cook and Anthony David, Dušan Kojić "Koja", Josip Boček
2 Srđan Gojković "Gile", Husein Hasanefendić "Hus", Stipica Kalođera, Vanja Lisak, Milivoje "Mića" Marković, Đorđe Petrović, Petar J. Mac Taggart, Tihomir "Tini" Varga

Voters
The voters were music critics, journalists, artists closely associated to the former Yugoslav popular music scene, and others. There are only several musicians among them. Each of them suggested ten former Yugoslav popular music albums he considers the greatest, and the second part of the book features short biographies of every one of them, and each one's choice of ten albums. The list was completed according to their suggestions. The voters were:

David Albahari – writer, translator, rock journalist
Duško Antonić – writer, one of the book authors
Bane Antović – art editor, one of the founders of the Music Television of Serbia
Zorica Bajin-Đukanović – art photographer, writer
Svetislav Basara – writer, former rock musician
Isidora Bjelica-Pajkić – writer, rock journalist
Miša Blam – jazz musician and composer
Mirjana Bobić-Mojsilović – journalist, writer
Jovan Ćirilov – one of the founders of BITEF, manager of Yugoslav Drama Theatre, writer, journalist
Srđan Dragojević – film director
Milan Gajić – rock journalist
Aleksandar Gajović – rock journalist, TV editor
Miroslav Galonja – rock journalist, former producer, songwriter and rock musician, playwright
Zoran Hristić – composer, former jazz musician, musical editor
Ivan Ivačković – rock journalist, writer
Jadranka Janković – rock journalist and critic
Marko Janković – rock journalist, radio and TV host
Petar Janjatović – rock journalist and critic
Nikola Karaklajić – chess master, rock journalist, radio host
Slobodan Konjović – rock journalist, radio host, former rock musician
Stevan Koprivica – writer, manager of Duško Radović Theatre
Siniša Kovačević – playwright, manager of Serbian National Theatre
Branka Kirilović – theatre critic, writer, songwriter
Nenad Kuzmić – music critic and editor
Sonja Lopatanov – ballerina, choreographer
Petar Lazić – Indexovo radio pozorište editor
Mile Lojpur – rock and roll musician
Branimir Lokner – rock journalist and critic
Petar Luković – rock critic, writer
Ratka Marić – sociologist, writer, rock journalist
Višnja Marjanović – magazine editor
Zoran Marjanović – record collector
Dubravka Marković – TV host, rock journalist
Goranka Matić – art photographer
Bogomir Mijatović – radio editor

Borislav Mitrović – rock journalist and critic, radio host
Kokan Mladenović – theatre director
Zoran Modli – disc jockey
Nikola Nešković – journalist, disc jockey
Tatjana Olujić – violinist
Nebojša Pajkić – writer, screenwriter
Vojislav Pantić – math professor, radio host, rock critic
Dejan Pataković – journalist, magazine editor
Gordan Paunović – journalist, musical editor, disc jockey
Vladan Paunović – journalist, translator, critic
Predrag Perišić – TV editor, playwright, screenwriter
Ivica Petrović – journalist, rock critic
Mladen Petrović – TV editor, playwright, songwriter
Peca Popović – rock journalist
Miloš Radivojević – TV and film director
Jovan Ristić – TV, theatre and film director, theatre manager
Ljubiša Ristić – theatre director and manager, politician
Ivan St. Rizinger – music critic, radio editor
Egon Savin – theatre director, university professor
Zoran Simjanović – composer, former rock musician
Lokica Stefanović – ballerina, choreographer
Gorčin Stojanović – theatre and film director, music critic
Srđan Stojanović – journalist, magazine editor
Danilo Štrbac – writer, one of the book authors
Bogdan Tirnanić – journalist
Dragan Todorović – journalist, writer, radio editor
Dinko Tucaković – film and TV director, screenwriter, journalist
Dušan Vesić – rock journalist
Jugoslav Vlahović – cartoonist, illustrator, graphic artist, former rock musician
Milan Vlajčić – film critic, writer
Ivana Vujčić – theatre director, BITEF art manager
Mihailo Vukobratović – film, TV and theatre director
Ksenija Zečević – composer, pianist
Aleksandar Žikić – radio and magazine editor, playwright

Book cover
The book cover was inspired by the cover of The Beatles album Sgt. Pepper's Lonely Hearts Club Band. It features rock and pop musicians Josipa Lisac, Bebi Dol, Nele Karajlić, Oliver Mandić, Marina Perazić, Branimir Štulić, Slađana Milošević and Dado Topić, Đorđe Marjanović, Dušan Kojić, Arsen Dedić, Đorđe Balašević, Viktorija, Kornelije Kovač, Zoran Miščević, Goran Bregović, Žika and Dragi Jelić, Oliver Dragojević and Mišo Kovač, Zdravko Čolić (in the Yugoslav People's Army uniform, from a photograph taken during his army service), Bora Đorđević (in a uniform similar to the ones The Beatles members are wearing on the cover of Sgt. Pepper's Lonely Hearts Club Band), and Momčilo Bajagić. The album cover also features the White Angel, Saint Sava, football player Dragan Džajić, bodybuilder Petar Čelik and his wife Irena (from the cover of Laboratorija Zvuka album Telo), actor Zoran Radmilović (in the role of King Ubu), scientist Nikola Tesla, film director Emir Kusturica, basketball player Vlade Divac, folk musician Toma Zdravković, Romani musician Šaban Bajramović, actors Dragan Nikolić and Milena Dravić (from the time of their hit TV show Obraz uz obraz), and a bust of the former Yugoslav president Josip Broz Tito.

Reactions
In his 2010 book Smijurijada, former Azra frontman Branimir Štulić commented on the book:

In a 2011 interview for Večernje novosti, Električni Orgazam frontman Srđan Gojković "Gile", commented on the fact that Električni Orgazam albums Distorzija and Kako bubanj kaže came in at No.24 and No.73, respectively:

In 2013, for the book's 15th anniversary, Balkanrock.com webzine interviewed some of the musicians whose work made the list. Zdenko Kolar (who played on Idoli albums Odbrana i poslednji dani and VIS Idoli, ranked No.1 and No.71 respectively, as well as on the split album Paket aranžman, ranked No.2) stated:

100 Best Serbian Albums Published after the Breakup of SFRY
In 2021 Antonić published the book Kako (ni)je propao rokenrol u Srbiji (How Rock 'n' Roll in Serbia (Didn't) Came to an End). Besides Antonić's essays on Serbian rock scene, the book also features a list of 100 best Serbian rock albums published after the breakup of SFR Yugoslavia. The list was formed according to a poll of 58 Serbian music journalists, critics, artists and others related to Serbian rock scene, conducted in a similar way to the poll in the book YU 100: najbolji albumi jugoslovenske rok i pop muzike.

See also 
Kako (ni)je propao rokenrol u Srbiji
Rock Express Top 100 Yugoslav Rock Songs of All Times
B92 Top 100 Domestic Songs

References

1998 non-fiction books
Music books
Serbian rock music
Yugoslav rock music
Yugoslav music